Henriette Sontag, born Gertrude Walpurgis Sontag, and, after her marriage, entitled Henriette, Countess Rossi (3 January 1806 – 17 June 1854), was a German operatic soprano of great international renown. She possessed a sweet-toned, lyrical voice and was a brilliant exponent of florid singing.

Life
Sontag was born at Koblenz, Germany, as Gertrude Walpurgis Sontag, to the actor Franz Sontag and his wife, the actress Franziska Sontag ( Martloff; 1788–1865). Her brother was the actor Karl Sontag. She made her début at the age of 6. In 1823 she sang at Leipzig in Carl Maria von Weber's Der Freischütz and in December of that year created the title role in his Euryanthe. Her success was immediate. She was invited to be the soprano soloist in the first performances of Beethoven's Symphony No. 9 and Missa Solemnis on 7 May 1824; she was only 18 years old at the time. In 1825 she was engaged by the Königstädter Theater, Berlin. 

In 1826, she was engaged at the Paris Comédie-Italienne, where she debuted in the role of Rosina in Gioachino Rossini's opera The Barber of Seville. She was also extremely successful in performance in England and Germany in the following years. When she visited Weimar, Goethe wrote a poem dedicated to her (Neue Siren).  Around 1829 she married Count Carlo Rossi in secret, after which she left the stage until her husband's financial situation deteriorated.

In 1849, she was encouraged by the impresario Benjamin Lumley to perform a season at Covent Garden Theatre. She proved to have fully retained her vocal powers. In 1852, she toured America, and in May 1854, at a literary evening in honor of Mexican president Antonio López de Santa Anna, she made public for the first time the lyrics that Francisco González Bocanegra had written to celebrate the nation (with an Italian musical arrangement). A day after singing Lucia di Lammermoor, she contracted cholera, which would claim her life at age 48.

Sontag died in Mexico City, Mexico, and is buried in Germany at St. Marienthal Abbey.  Her sister Nina Sontag (1811–1879), originally also an opera-singer, had retired there as a nun in 1844.

Hector Berlioz wrote of Sontag:

References
Notes

Sources
 Warrack, John (n.d.). "Sontag [Sonntag], Henriette (Gertrud Walpurgis)", Oxford Music Online, accessed 4 July 2017

External links

1806 births
1854 deaths
Deaths from cholera
Infectious disease deaths in Mexico
German operatic sopranos
Musicians from Koblenz
Italian countesses
19th-century German women opera singers